John Mecom may refer to:
 John W. Mecom Sr., American oilman
 John W. Mecom Jr., his son, American businessman and football team owner